Mkhulu Malusi Manqoba Skenjana (born 6 April 1982), popularly known as Khulu Skenjana, is a South African actor. He is best known for his roles in the popular television serials Machine Gun Preacher, Zulu and Zama Zama.

Personal life
He was born on 6 April 1982 in Soweto, South Africa.

He was married to fellow actress Mona Monyane. They married in 2016 and spend four years together with two children. His second baby Amani-Amaza Wamazulu Skenjana was born on 16 November 2017 and died seven days after the birth. His eldest daughter is Ase-Ahadi Lesemole Mamphai Skenjana who was born in August 2016.

Career
Since 2000s he started to play guest uncredited appearances in the television serials such as A Place Called Home, Binnelanders and Generations. Meanwhile, he made the appearance in popular television serial All Access Mzansi and rendered as a voice artist. Then he appeared in the serial Entabeni and played the role 'Kumkani Modise'.

In 2008, he played the role of 'Mandla' in the mini-series Noah's Ark from July to August. In the same year, he made a cameo role in the NBC series The Philanthropist. Then in 2010, he played the role of 'David Tabane' in the  series The Mating Game. Meanwhile, he appeared with the role 'Thomas' in the series Hola Mpinji. He also appeared in several popular television series such as Sokhulu & Partners, Rhythm City, Hola Mpinji, A Place Called Home and Jozi-H.

In 2011, he made film debut with the role 'Max' in the film 48. In the same year, he appeared in the film Machine Gun Preacher. In 2013, he played a lead role 'Themba' in the film Zulu. In the same year, he joined the second season of Intersexions and then in Tempy Pushas.

Television serials
 A Place Called Home as Guest Star
 All Access Mzansi as Voice Over Artist
 Binnelanders as Guest Star
 Change Down as Voice Over
 Entabeni as Kumkani Modise
 Erfsondes as Stanley
 Fallen as S'bu Majola
 Generations as Guest Star
 Hard Copy as Malume Joe
 Hola Mpinji! as Thomas
 Imposter as Caesar
 Intersexions as Montsho
 Isono: The Sin as Gazati
 It's Complicated as Diliza
 Jacob's Cross as Mr Black
 Jozi as Guest Star
 Lockdown as Mamba
 Matatiele as Construction Guy
 Noah's Ark as Mandla
 Single Guyz as James
 Sokhulu & Partners as Guest Star
 Tempy Pushas as Zenzele Zembe
 The Bantu Hour as Cast Member
 The Docket as Guest Star
 The Mating Game as David Tabane
 The Mayor as Jabu Isaacs
 The Philanthropist as Sergeant
 uSkroef noSexy as Ntelezi
 Zabalaza as Ntsika

Filmography

References

External links
 
 Losing my newborn baby was a turning point: Mona Monyane
 Mona Monyane gets real: Have that child for you, sis
 Mona Monyane and Khulu Skenjane part ways!
 Mona Monyane and hubby Khulu Skenjana have separated!
 Mona Skenjane to her hubby: I soldier on because you love me so

Living people
South African male television actors
1982 births
South African male film actors
People from Soweto